Gallop P. Franklin II is an American politician and pharmacist serving as a member of the Florida House of Representatives for the 8th district. He assumed office on November 8, 2022.Gallop is the son of Margaret Franklin and Gallop Franklin Sr. He is married to Chelsea Matthews Franklin.

Early life and education 
Franklin was born and raised in Tallahassee, Florida. He earned a Doctor of Pharmacy degree from Florida A&M University.

Career 
Prior to entering politics, Franklin worked as a pharmacist at Publix and Tallahassee Memorial HealthCare. He was also a visiting professor of pharmacy at Florida A&M University. Franklin was elected to the Florida House of Representatives in November 2022.

References 

Living people
People from Tallahassee, Florida
Florida A&M University alumni
Florida A&M University faculty
Democratic Party members of the Florida House of Representatives
American pharmacists
Pharmacists from Florida
21st-century American politicians
21st-century African-American politicians
Year of birth missing (living people)